John Kenneth Reader (November 11, 1925 in Lawrence, Massachusetts – November 10, 2008 in Hingham, Massachusetts) was an American football official. After graduation from the College of the Holy Cross in 1950, football star Reader became an on-field official.  In 1960, he joined the American Football League and officiated its first game, between the Denver Broncos and the Boston Patriots on September 9, 1960. He was one of only nine men who officiated in the AFL for its entire ten-year existence, 1960 through 1969.  After the 1970 merger of the NFL with the AFL, he continued working as a referee until he retired after the 1973 season and became an officiating supervisor in the NFL, retiring shortly before his death.

A 1996 inductee to the Central Catholic High of Lawrence Hall of Fame, Mr. Reader was part of some of the most historic moments of the American Football League.

Reader, who died of cancer only one day shy of his 83rd birthday on Nov. 10, 2008 in Hingham, Massachusetts, was also a back judge at Super Bowl I (1967) and III (1969), when those games were the World Championships between the AFL and NFL champions. He was shown in an iconic image in the January 20, 1969 issue of Sports Illustrated, wearing number 42, with his arms raised signaling a New York Jets touchdown by fullback Matt Snell during the AFL champions' 16-7 win over the NFL champion Baltimore Colts in Super Bowl III.

See also
 List of American Football League officials

External links
 

1925 births
2008 deaths
American Football League officials
Holy Cross Crusaders football players
National Football League officials
Sportspeople from Lawrence, Massachusetts